The 212th Battalion, CEF was a unit in the Canadian Expeditionary Force during the First World War.  Based in Winnipeg, Manitoba, the unit began recruiting in early 1916 throughout the province.  The battalion was disbanded while still in Canada and the men transferred to the 97th Battalion, CEF.  The 212th Battalion, CEF had one Officer Commanding: Lieut-Col. E. C. Pitman.

See also
97th Battalion (American Legion), CEF
211th Battalion (American Legion), CEF 
237th Battalion (American Legion), CEF

References
 Meek, John F. Over the Top! The Canadian Infantry in the First World War. Orangeville, Ont.: The Author, 1971.

Battalions of the Canadian Expeditionary Force
Military units and formations of Manitoba